James George Mattos (January 25, 1932 - March 19, 2020) was an American politician in the state of South Carolina. He served in the South Carolina House of Representatives as a member of the Democratic Party from 1985 to 1994 representing Greenville County, South Carolina. He was a teacher and coach.

References

1932 births
2020 deaths
Democratic Party members of the South Carolina House of Representatives
People from Spartanburg, South Carolina